Prest-O Change-O is a 1939 Merrie Melodies cartoon directed by Chuck Jones, and first released on March 25, 1939, by Warner Bros. It is the second appearance of Bugs Bunny as a manic white hare who made his first appearance in Porky's Hare Hunt, a cartoon that was produced and copyrighted in 1937 and released in April 1938, featuring him in the same early design. This is also the character's first appearance in a Merrie Melodies color film. The prototype of Bugs Bunny the screwy rabbit makes his third appearance in the next hare-based short film, Hare-um Scare-um (1939).

Plot
The Two Curious Puppies, one big and one little, are being pursued by a dog catcher until they hide in an abandoned house. They soon discover the house is owned by Sham-Fu, a magician who is unseen over the course of the short. As a result, each puppy (both of whom are separated from each other shortly after entering the house) encounters all manner of magic tricks, including Sham-Fu's pet hare. The bigger puppy is left to defend himself against the hare, itself a more than competent illusionist capable of all sorts of acts of cartoon physics, while the little one is engaged in a reckless battle with a Hindu rope and a magic wand, the latter of which he ends up accidentally swallowing, giving him bizarre hiccups throughout the rest of the movie.

The puppies and the hare all end up crashing into each other, at which point both puppies immediately attempt to pack everything back into Sham-Fu's trunk. Inexplicably, the little dog hiccups out a balloon containing the mischievous hare. However, this time, when the hare attempts another disappearing act, the bigger puppy who has had enough of the hare's tricks is able to stop it in its tracks and punches the hare as hard as possible. The scene irises out on the hare, whose eye is blackened and covered with a lampshade and sitting in a goldfish bowl with his feet sticking out.

Home media
The short was released on Blu-ray on the Looney Tunes Platinum Collection: Volume 2, Disc 2.

References

External links

1939 films
1939 short films
1939 animated films
Merrie Melodies short films
Animated films without speech
Warner Bros. Cartoons animated short films
Short films directed by Chuck Jones
Films about magic and magicians
Bugs Bunny films
Animated films about dogs
Films produced by Leon Schlesinger
1930s Warner Bros. animated short films